Kalidasa lanata is a species of planthopper in the family Fulgoridae found in India. They have a slender and flexible stalk-like outgrowth arising from above the tip of the snout.

References

Hemiptera of Asia
Aphaeninae